The 1982 Custom Credit Australian Indoor Championships was a men's tennis tournament played on indoor hard courts at the Hordern Pavilion in Sydney, Australia and was part of the 1982 Volvo Grand Prix. It was the 10th edition of the tournament and was held from 11 October through 17 October 1982. Second-seeded John McEnroe won his third successive singles title at the event.

Finals

Singles

 John McEnroe defeated  Gene Mayer 6–4, 6–1, 6–4
 It was McEnroe's 3rd singles title of the year and the 37th of his career.

Doubles

 John McEnroe /  Peter Rennert defeated  Steve Denton /  Mark Edmondson 6–3, 7–6
 It was McEnroe's 5th title of the year and the 79th of his career. It was Rennert's 2nd title of the year and the 2nd of his career.

References

External links
 ITF – tournament edition details

 
Custom Credit Australian Indoor Championships
Australian Indoor Tennis Championships
In
Custom Credit Australian Indoor Championships
Sports competitions in Sydney
Tennis in New South Wales